Making Couples Happy is an Australian lifestyle television series aired on ABC1 on 14 February 2013 until 7 March 2013, It narrated by David Wenham.

Australian Broadcasting Corporation original programming
Australian non-fiction television series
2013 Australian television series debuts
2013 Australian television series endings